The Fellowship of the British Academy consists of world-leading scholars and researchers in the humanities and social sciences. Fellows are elected each year in July at the Academy's annual general meeting.

First fellows 
The following fellows were appointed in the Charter of the Incorporation of the British Academy on 8 August 1902:
 The Right Honourable The Earl of Rosebery, KG, KT
 The Right Honourable The Viscount Dillon, President of the Society of Antiquaries
 The Right Honourable The Lord Reay, GCSI, GCIE, President of the Royal Asiatic Society
 The Right Honourable Arthur James Balfour, MP
 The Right Honourable John Morley, MP
 The Right Honourable James Bryce, MP
 The Right Honourable William Edward Hartpole Lecky, MP
 Sir William Reynell Anson, Baronet, MP, Warden of All Souls College, Oxford
 Sir Frederick Pollock, Baronet, Corpus Professor of Jurisprudence in the University of Oxford
 Sir Edward Maunde Thompson, KCB., Director and Principal Librarian, British Museum
 Sir Henry Churchill Maxwell-Lyte, KCB, Deputy-Keeper of the Public Records
 Sir Courtenay Peregrine Ilbert, KCSI, CIE
 Sir Richard Claverhouse Jebb, MP, Regius Professor of Greek in the University of Cambridge
 David Binning Monro, Provost of Oriel College and Vice-Chancellor of the University of Oxford
 Adolphus William Ward, Master of Peterhouse and Vice-Chancellor of the University of Cambridge
 Edward Caird, Master of Balliol College, Oxford
 Henry Francis Pelham, President of Trinity College and Camden Professor of Ancient History in the University of Oxford
 John Rhys, Principal of Jesus College and Professor of Celtic in the University of Oxford
 The Reverend George Salmon, DD, Provost of Trinity College, Dublin
 John Bagnell Bury, Regius Professor of Greek in the University of Dublin
 Samuel Henry Butcher, Professor of Greek in the University of Edinburgh
 Ingram Bywater, Regius Professor of Greek in the University of Oxford
 Edward Byles Cowell, Professor of Sanskrit in the University of Cambridge
 The Reverend William Cunningham, DD
 Thomas William Rhys Davids, Professor of Pali in University College, London
 Albert Venn Dicey, KC, Vinerian Professor of English Law in the University of Oxford
 The Reverend Canon Samuel Rolles Driver, DD, Regius Professor of Hebrew in the University of Oxford
 Robinson Ellis, Corpus Professor of Latin in the University of Oxford
 Arthur John Evans, Keeper of the Ashmolean Museum, Oxford
 The Reverend Andrew Martin Fairbairn, DD, Principal of Mansfield College, Oxford
 The Reverend Robert Flint, DD, Professor of Divinity in the University of Edinburgh
 James George Frazer
 Israel Gollancz, University Lecturer in English in the University of Cambridge
 Thomas Hodgkin
 Shadworth Hollway Hodgson
 Thomas Erskine Holland, KC, Professor of International Law and Diplomacy in the University of Oxford
 Frederick William Maitland, Downing Professor of English Law in the University of Cambridge
 Alfred Marshall, Professor of Political Economy in the University of Cambridge
 The Reverend John Eyton Bickersteth Mayor, Professor of Latin in the University of Cambridge
 James Augustus Henry Murray
 William Mitchell Ramsay, Professor of Humanity in the University of Aberdeen
 The Reverend Canon William Sanday, DD, Lady Margaret Professor of Divinity in the University of Oxford
 The Reverend Walter William Skeat, Elrington and Bosworth Professor of Anglo-Saxon in the University of Cambridge
 Leslie Stephen
 Whitley Stokes CSI, CIE
 Rev Henry Barclay Swete, DD, Regius Professor of Divinity in the University of Cambridge
 Rev. Henry Fanshawe Tozer
 Robert Yelverton Tyrrell, Professor of Ancient History in the University of Dublin
 James Ward, Professor of Mental Philosophy in the University of Cambridge

1903
The following were elected fellows in March 1903:
 Professor B. Bosanquet
 Professor E. G. Browne
 Arthur Cohen, KC
 F. C. Conybeare
 F. Y. Edgeworth
 C. H. Firth
 A. Campbell Fraser
 Sir Edward Fry
 Dr F. J. Furnivall
 Professor P. Gardner
 Dr Henry Jackson
 Dr M. R. James
 Dr F. G. Kenyon
 Professor W. P. Ker
 The Lord Lindley
 Sir A. Lyall, KCB, GCIE
 Professor W. R. Morfill
 Dr A. S. Murray
 Professor J. S. Nicholson
 Dr G. W. Prothero
 Very Rev. J. Armitage Robinson, DD
 Professor G. F. Stout

1904
The following were elected fellows in June 1904:
 Rev. Professor T. K. Cheyne, DD
 F. J. Haverfield
 Professor Henry Jones
 Professor A. S. Napier
 Professor A. Seth Pringle Pattison
 Dr John Peile
 Professor W. M. Flinders Petrie
 Dr R. L. Poole
 Professor W. Ridgeway
 Sir G. O. Trevelyan, Baronet
 Sir Spencer Walpole, KCB
 Professor Joseph Wright

1905
 Professor F. C. Burkitt
 Professor H. S. Foxwell
 Professor W. M. Lindsay
 Sir Charles W. C. Oman, KBE, MP
 Professor W. R. Sorley
 Edward Armstrong
 Lord Davey
 Lord Goschen
 Professor B. P. Grenfell
 Dr D. G. Hogarth, CMG
 Sir Paul Vinogradoff
 John Wordsworth

1906
 Sir G. F. Warner
 Ven. Archdeacon Charles
 Dr W. J. Courthope, CB
 Professor J. FitzMaurice-Kelly
 Andrew Lang
 Professor A. A. MacDonell
 Dr J. Ellis McTaggart
 Rev. Canon Moore

1907
 H. A. L. Fisher
 Dr Henry Bradley
 Professor J. P. Postgate
 Professor J. Cook Wilson

1908
 Marquess Curzon of Keddleston, KG

1909
 Professor Hume Brown
 Lord Justice Kennedy
 Professor C. S. Kenny
 Very Rev. Hastings Rashdall
 Sir John E. Sandys
 Professor Cuthbert H. Turner

See also 
 List of fellows of the British Academy

References
Unless stated otherwise, the names are from the list of fellows, alive and dead, in Proceedings of the British Academy, vol. xviii (1932), pp. vii–x.

Citations